Dillon Senan De Silva (born 18 April 2002) is a professional footballer who plays as a winger for Queens Park Rangers. Born in England, he plays for the Sri Lanka national team.

Club career
De Silva started his youth career at Tottenham Hotspur, where he spent three years. Prior to joining Tottenham, he also had unsuccessful trials at Arsenal. He joined the youth academy of Queens Park Rangers in 2017. In July 2022, he signed a contract extension with the club until June 2023.

On 8 October 2022, De Silva joined National League side Torquay United on a month's loan. On 1 March 2023, he was recalled by his parent club.

International career
Born in England, De Silva represents Sri Lanka at international football. In May 2021, he received his first call-up for the 2022 FIFA World Cup qualifiers against Lebanon and South Korea. He made his debut on 5 June 2021, coming on as a substitute in a 3–2 defeat against Lebanon.

Career statistics

International

Scores and results list Sri Lanka's goal tally first, score column indicates score after each De Silva goal.

References

External links
 
 

2002 births
Living people
English people of Sri Lankan descent
Footballers from Camden Town
Association football wingers
Sri Lankan footballers
English footballers
Sri Lanka international footballers
Tottenham Hotspur F.C. players
Barking F.C. players
Queens Park Rangers F.C. players
Torquay United F.C. players
National League (English football) players